The Suzuki RG200 Gamma was produced in 1992 for the Japanese domestic market with a recommended retail price of 485,000 yen.
It was available in only one colour variation; rouge red No.2.
The notable points are its race replica styling and single-cylinder engine with an electric starter.
It is similar to the better-known RG125 Gamma, though the larger engine capacity means it is able to be ridden on the tolled highways and freeways in Japan.

Specifications
Power: 
Weight: 
Fuel capacity:

See also 
List of Suzuki motorcycles

References

External links 
http://galf.hp.infoseek.co.jp/spec/spec.html (in Japanese)

RG200